Juan Molina may refer to:

 John John Molina (Juan Molina, born 1965), Puerto Rican former boxer
 Juan Molina (cyclist) (born 1948), Salvadoan cyclist
 Juan Molina (swimmer) (born 1991), Colombian swimmer
 Juan Ignacio Molina (1740–1829), Chilean Jesuit priest, naturalist and historian
 Juan Manuel Molina (born 1979), Spanish former race walker
 Juan Ramón Molina (1875–1908), Honduran poet
 Juan Bautista Molina, Argentine military commander and ultranationalist